Patitta Attayatamavitaya (born August 26, 1986), nicknamed New, is a Thai actress and television personality. She starred in the film Pai In Love.

References

1986 births
Living people
Patitta Attayatamavitaya
Thai television personalities